Zyazikov is an Ingush surname. Notable people with the surname include:

Murat Zyazikov (born 1957), Russian politician
Ruslan Zyazikov (born 1984), Russian footballer

Russian-language surnames